The Klamath Falls Gems were a Minor League Baseball team in the Far West League. They were located in Klamath Falls, Oregon and were the Class D affiliate of the Philadelphia Phillies. They played at Gem Stadium.

Year-by-year record

Defunct Far West League teams
Defunct minor league baseball teams
Professional baseball teams in Oregon
Defunct baseball teams in Oregon
Klamath Falls, Oregon
Philadelphia Phillies minor league affiliates
1948 establishments in Oregon
1951 disestablishments in Oregon
Baseball teams disestablished in 1951
Baseball teams established in 1948
Far West League teams